Universal Instruments Corporation is an electronics technology company based in Conklin, New York.  Universal Instruments builds automated machines that allow electronics manufacturing services companies to construct surface-mount technology and through-hole technology circuits, such as SMT placement equipment, insertion mount machines, and machines for electronic packaging.  The company was founded in 1919 as the Universal Instruments and Metal Company in nearby Vestal, and found its initial success as a tool and die maker for IBM.  In addition to electronics manufacturing machine, Universal Instruments manufactures DEKA's Luke Arm prosthetic for Mobius Bionics.

References

Electronics companies of the United States
Companies based in Broome County, New York